Teodors is a Latvian masculine given name. It is a cognate of the name Theodore. People bearing the name Teodors include:
Teodors Bergs (1902–1966), Latvian chess master
Teodors Bļugers (born 1994), Latvian ice hocker player
Teodors Eniņš (1934–2008), Latvian neurosurgeon and politician
Teodors Grīnbergs (1870–1962), Latvian prelate of the Evangelical Lutheran Church of Latvia and first Archbishop of Riga
Teodors Spāde (1891–1970), Latvian naval officer
Teodors Sukatnieks (1894–unknown) Latvian track and field athlete
Teodors Ūders (1868–1915), Latvian artist

References

Latvian masculine given names